Arjona is a town and municipality located in the Bolívar Department, northern Colombia, about 30 km southeast of Cartagena de Indias. It is a sister city of Pawtucket, Rhode Island.

Notable people
Ernesto Frieri, professional baseball player
Ronaldo Hernández, professional baseball player
José Quintana, professional baseball player

References

Municipalities of Bolívar Department